is a Japanese football player for Kamatamare Sanuki.

Club statistics
Updated to 23 February 2018.

References

External links

Profile at Kamatamare Sanuki

1984 births
Living people
National Institute of Fitness and Sports in Kanoya alumni
Association football people from Nagasaki Prefecture
Japanese footballers
J2 League players
Japan Football League players
Kamatamare Sanuki players
Association football midfielders